The 2014 Pennsylvania gubernatorial election was held on November 4, 2014, to elect the governor and lieutenant governor of Pennsylvania, concurrently with elections to the United States Senate in other states and elections to the United States House of Representatives and various state and local elections.

Incumbent Republican Governor Tom Corbett ran for re-election to a second term but was defeated by the Democratic nominee, Tom Wolf. Corbett was the first incumbent Pennsylvania governor to lose reelection since William Bigler in 1854, and the first Republican to ever do so.

Corbett was considered vulnerable, as reflected in his low approval ratings. An August 2013 Franklin & Marshall College poll found that only 17% of voters thought Corbett was doing an "excellent" or "good" job, only 20% thought he deserved to be reelected, and 62% said the state was "off on the wrong track". Politico called Corbett the most vulnerable incumbent governor in the country, The Washington Post ranked the election as the most likely for a party switch, and the majority of election forecasters rated it "likely Democratic".

Despite Corbett's unpopularity and speculation that he would face a primary challenge, he was unopposed in the Republican primary. The Democrats nominated businessman and former secretary of the Pennsylvania Department of Revenue Tom Wolf, who defeated U.S. Representative Allyson Schwartz, Pennsylvania Treasurer Robert McCord and former secretary of the Pennsylvania Department of Environmental Protection Katie McGinty in the primary election. In primary elections for lieutenant governor, which were held separately, incumbent Republican lieutenant governor Jim Cawley was renominated unopposed, and the Democrats selected State Senator Mike Stack. 

This is the first Pennsylvania gubernatorial election since 1982 in which the winner was of the same party as the incumbent president, and the first time since 1934 this occurred during a Democratic administration. This also remains the last time that a Pennsylvania gubernatorial election has been decided by a single-digit margin, as Democrats have won each subsequent election by large double-digit margins.

Background
Democrats and Republicans have alternated in the governorship of Pennsylvania every eight years from 1950 to 2010. This has been referred to as "the cycle", but it was broken with a Democratic Party win in 2014. Pennsylvania has also voted against the party of the sitting president in 18 of the last 19 gubernatorial contests dating back to 1938; Democrats lost 16 of the previous 17 Pennsylvania gubernatorial races with a Democratic president in the White House, a pattern begun in 1860. The last incumbent governor to be defeated for re-election was Democrat William Bigler in 1854. Until 1968, governors could only serve one term; the state constitution now allows governors to serve two consecutive terms. Libertarian nominee Ken Krawchuk failed to file the paperwork to be on the ballot in time and was excluded from the election as a result.

Republican primary
Incumbent Tom Corbett filed to run, as did Bob Guzzardi, an attorney and conservative activist. However, Guzzardi failed to file a statement of financial interests as required by law, after being told by an employee of the State Department that it was unnecessary. Four Republicans, backed by the state Republican Party, sued to have him removed from the race. The case reached the state Supreme Court, which ordered that Guzzardi's name be struck from the ballot. NASCAR Camping World Truck Series veteran Norm Benning backed Governor Corbett during the later half of the NASCAR season with Re-Elect Tom Corbett placed on his truck.

Candidates

Declared
 Tom Corbett, incumbent governor of Pennsylvania

Disqualified
 Bob Guzzardi, attorney, businessman and conservative activist

Declined
 Bruce Castor, Montgomery County Commissioner
 Jim Gerlach, U.S. Representative and candidate for governor in 2010
 Tom Smith, businessman and nominee for the U.S. Senate in 2012
 Pat Toomey, U.S. Senator

Endorsements

Polling

Results

Democratic primary

Candidates

Declared
 Rob McCord, Pennsylvania Treasurer
 Katie McGinty, former secretary of the Pennsylvania Department of Environmental Protection
 Allyson Schwartz, U.S. Representative
 Tom Wolf, businessman and former secretary of the Pennsylvania Department of Revenue

Withdrew
 John Hanger, former Secretary of the Pennsylvania Department of Environmental Protection
 Jo Ellen Litz, Lebanon County Commissioner (failed to qualify)
 Max Myers, businessman and former pastor
 Ed Pawlowski, Mayor of Allentown
 Jack Wagner, former Pennsylvania Auditor General, candidate for governor in 2010 and candidate for Mayor of Pittsburgh in 2013

Declined
 Bob Casey, Jr., U.S. Senator
 Scott Conklin, state representative and nominee for lieutenant governor in 2010
 Kathy Dahlkemper, former U.S. Representative
 Eugene DePasquale, Pennsylvania Auditor General
 Kathleen Kane, Pennsylvania Attorney General
 Tom Knox, businessman, candidate for Mayor of Philadelphia in 2007 and candidate for governor in 2010
 Daylin Leach, state senator (running for Congress)
 Patrick Murphy, former U.S. Representative
 Michael Nutter, Mayor of Philadelphia
 Ed Rendell, former governor
 Joe Sestak, former U.S. Representative and nominee for the U.S. Senate in 2010
 Josh Shapiro, chairman of the Montgomery County Board of Commissioners
 Tim Solobay, state senator
 Michael J. Stack III, state senator (running for lieutenant governor)

Endorsements

Polling

 ** Internal poll for the Tom Wolf Campaign
 ^ Internal poll for the Kathleen McGinty Campaign
 * Internal poll for the Allyson Schwartz Campaign

Results

General election

Candidates
 Tom Wolf (D); former secretary of the Pennsylvania Department of Revenue
 Tom Corbett (R); incumbent governor
 Paul Glover (G); activist
 Jonathan D. Jewell (I); Independent
 Ken Krawchuk (L); technology consultant and nominee for governor in 1998 and 2002

Debates
Complete video of debate, September 22, 2014
Complete video of debate, October 8, 2014

Spending
As of mid-October, Wolf had raised $27.6 million and spent $21.1 million while Corbett had raised $20.6 million and spent $19.3 million. The two campaigns had run over 21,000 television ads, costing over $13 million.

Predictions

Polling

With Corbett

With Gerlach

With Guzzardi

With Kelly

Results

By congressional district
Corbett won 10 of 18 congressional districts, despite losing statewide to Wolf, though at the time most of the districts were gerrymanders drawn by Republican legislators. Wolf won the 6th, 7th and 8th districts, which all elected Republicans to the House.

See also
 2014 Pennsylvania lieutenant gubernatorial election
 2014 United States gubernatorial elections
 2014 United States House of Representatives elections in Pennsylvania

Notes

References

External links
 Pennsylvania gubernatorial election, 2014 at Ballotpedia

Official campaign websites
 Tom Corbett for Governor Republican 
 Tom Wolf for Governor Democrat 

2014 Pennsylvania elections
2014
2014 United States gubernatorial elections